Bradley H. Jones Jr. (born January 9, 1965 in North Reading, Massachusetts) is a Republican member of the Massachusetts House of Representatives since January 1995.  He has also been the minority leader of the House since 2003. Jones represents the 20th Middlesex district, which includes Lynnfield, parts of Middleton, North Reading and parts of Reading.

Early life and career
Jones grew up in North Reading going to North Reading High School, later attending Johns Hopkins University and Harvard Extension School. Jones was first elected to the North Reading Republican Town Committee in 1988 where he still serves. He was later elected to the North Reading Board of Selectmen where he served from 1993 to 1999. Jones also has served on the North Reading Finance Committee (1992–1993, 1999–present) and the North Reading Housing Authority (1988–1992).

He started his career in the Massachusetts House of Representatives in 1995 and was elected to his first leadership position in 2001 as the Assistant Minority Leader. Then in 2003 he ascended to the position of Minority Leader and has served in that position since.

Organizations that Jones is a part of include Eastern Middlesex Services, where he was a former member of the Board of Directors, and the American Legislative Exchange Council (ALEC).

Jones lives with his wife Linda and their two children in North Reading.

2009 leadership contest
In November 2008, Rep. Lew Evangilidis announced that he planned to challenge Jones for House Minority Leader, the top Republican post in the Massachusetts House of Representatives. In the January 2009 leadership vote, Evangelidis lost the contest to incumbent Jones by two votes, 9 to 7.

See also
 2019–2020 Massachusetts legislature
 2021–2022 Massachusetts legislature

References

External links
 Office House Page

|-

|-

1965 births
21st-century American politicians
Harvard Extension School alumni
Johns Hopkins University alumni
Living people
Republican Party members of the Massachusetts House of Representatives